WIBC may refer to:

 West Island Badminton Club
 WIBC (FM), a radio station (93.1 FM) licensed to Indianapolis, Indiana, United States
 WFNI, a radio station (1070 AM) licensed to Indianapolis, Indiana, which held the call sign WIBC from 1938 to 2007
 Women's International Bowling Congress
 Women's International Boxing Council
 Women's Interstate Basketball Conference, the inaugural season of what would become the Australian Women's National Basketball League
 Western International Band Clinic, an annual music conference held in SeaTac, Washington
 Wrought Iron Bridge Company